Alathyria is a genus of bivalves belonging to the family Hyriidae.

The species of this genus are found in Australia.

Species:

Alathyria condola 
Alathyria jacksoni 
Alathyria pertexta 
Alathyria profuga

References

Hyriidae
Bivalve genera
Taxa named by Tom Iredale
Taxa described in 1934